Mairia hirsuta is a tufted perennial, herbaceous plant of up to  high, that is assigned to the family Asteraceae. Most of its narrow to broad elliptic or inverted egg-shaped leaves are part of the basal rosette, have margin that is rolled under, with rounded or pointy teeth or with some peg-like extensions, lightly woolly on the upper surface and densely woolly on the underside, but always the green remains visible. Flower heads have been found from July to November, mostly after a fire or when the soil has been disturbed. The species can be found in the southern mountains of the Western Cape province of South Africa.

Taxonomy 
This species of fire daisy was first described by the famous Swedish botanist Carl Linnaeus in 1771 as Cineraria purpurata, based on a herbarium specimen from Caput Bonae Spei [Cape of Good Hope], a term then used for the larger Cape Region, that was sent to him by the governor of the Dutch Cape Colony between 1751 and 1771, Ryk Tulbagh. The description was however too general to determine without doubt which plant species it concerned, and Augustin Pyramus de Candolle in 1836, listed it as an inadequately known species. De Candolle in 1836, also described Mairia hirsuta based on four collections from the Langeberg to the northwest of Swellendam at Puspasvalei, Voormansbosch, Duivelsbosch and the banks of the Keurbooms River made by Christian Friedrich Ecklon and Karl Ludwig Philipp Zeyher. In 1891, Otto Kuntze reassigned it, making the combination Zyrphelis hirsuta. The name Cineraria purpurata is disregarded from that time on, until Glynis Cron, Kevin Balkwill and Eric B. Knox identify a lectotype and subsequently exclude the species from Cineraria, in their revision of that genus in 2006. In 2011, Santiago Ortiz and Ulrike Zinnecker-Wiegand revised the genera Mairia, Gymnostephium and Zyrphelis, and reinstated M. hirsuta. John Manning synonymised M. hirsuta and Cineraria purpurata in 2016, proposing the new combination Mairia purpurata. This has however not yet gained wide acceptance. The species is not synonymous with Gymnostephium hirsutum, described by Christian Friedrich Lessing in 1832.

Description 
Most of its leaves are part of the basal rosette, but some are set alternately on the lower parts of the approximately nine to eighteen inflorescence stalks. The leaf axils are sometimes densely woolly. The leaf blade varies in outline between narrowly or broadly inverted egg-shaped and narrowly elliptic to elliptic, mostly 4–10 cm (1–4 in) long (full range 3–12 cm) and 1–3 cm (0.6–1.4 in) wide (full range –5 cm). The leaves have a blunt to pointy tip and a margin that is rolled under, with rounded or pointy teeth or is sometimes almost entire with some peg-like extensions. The upper surface shows a distinct main vein, is hairless or has some dispersed woolly hairs. The lower surface of the leaves is leathery and hard, and sometimes succulent and then the netted veins may be nearly invisible. The lower leaf surface always remains visible through the dense or more open layer of woolly hairs, and appears whitish scaly with shiny, amber-coloured glands.

Rarely the flower stalk branches in the upper two-thirds.

The between thirty two and forty six overlapping bracts, arranged in four whorls, that jointly surround the florets in the same head, form a broadly bell-shaped involucre that is 1–1 cm (– in) high and 2–3 cm (–1 in) in diameter. Those in the outermost whorl are purplish, densely woolly, line-shaped to very narrowly egg-shaped, oval or inverted egg-shaped, 7–8 mm (0.28–0.34 in) long and 1½–2¾ mm (0.06–0.11 in) wide, with a pointy tip, with a fringe of equally long and regularly spaced hairs.

Florets 
Each flower head has about thirty, female ray florets. The corolla is reddish purple, mauve, pink or white. The lower tube-shaped part is 5–7 mm (0.20–0.28 in) long has some glandular hairs. The ray florets do not contain staminodes. The five anthers, which are, as is usual in the entire family Asteraceae, fused in a tube, are about 1–2 mm (0.06–0.08 in) long, each with a triangular appendage of about  mm (0.02 in) at their tip.

Surrounding the base of the corolla of both ray and disc florets are two whorls of white to straw-coloured pappus bristles. The cypselae have four to five, mostly dark brown, distinct ribs along their lengths. The cypselae are covered in shiny yellow glands.

Differences with related species 
The leaves of M. hirsuta are not as tidily arranged in rosettes as in the other species, and some leaves can even be found along the lower parts of the inflorescence stalks.

Mairia hirsuta can easily be confused with M. robusta that has similar leaves, and also has long ray florets that lack staminodes. However, the underside of the leaves of M. hirsuta is visible and greenish, despite densely to sparsely woolly hair (giving a whitish scaly appearance, with shiny, amber-coloured glands). The lower leaf surface in M. robusta on the other hand, consists of two layers of hairs, a bluish grey cobwebby layer through which longer woolly hairs extend, making it white in colour and the leaf surface isn't visible through the hairs at all. In addition, the involucral bracts in M. hirsuta are overlapping, with the outer bracts distinctly smaller than the inner ones, whereas in M. robusta all bracts are more or less the same size.

Distribution, ecology and conservation 
Mairia hirsuta is a local endemic of the Langeberg between Swellendam, Suurbraak and the neighbouring Warmwaterberg. Here it grows in a fynbos vegetation on the steep, south-facing slopes.

References

External links 
 Photos on iNaturalist

hirsuta
Endemic flora of South Africa
Plants described in 1771